Herochroma aethalia is a moth of the family Geometridae first described by Louis Beethoven Prout in 1927. It is found on Sumatra in Indonesia.

References

Moths described in 1927
Pseudoterpnini
Moths of Indonesia